The vehicle registration plates of Cyprus are composed of three letters and three digits (e.g. ABC 123). A simple incremental numbering system is used; numbers run from 001 to 999 per letter sequence (alphabetic), so that, for example, the plate to be issued after MAA 999 would be MAB 001. However, registrants may be allowed to choose a number from available numbers in the extant letter sequence.

The dimensions of Cyprus plates were similar to their British counterparts, and until 2004, characters were printed in black and in the same typeface as used on British plates. Plates from 2004 onwards are made of metal; between 1973 and 2004, they were made of plastic.

A new law on vehicle registration plates came into force on 3 June 2013, altering the design. Plates made before that date are white on the front of the vehicle and yellow on the rear, whereas new plates are white both on the front and the rear and, in addition, carry the month and year the vehicle was first registered in any country. The new series began with the combination MAA 001, skipping the remaining Lxx combinations. Replacing old plates with new ones has been made mandatory for motorcycles, taxis and lorries. Taxi plates are yellow on both sides and rental car plates are red on both sides, but no longer carry the T and Z prefix, respectively.

Following Cyprus' entry to the European Union in 2004, plates produced since have a blue band on the left edge with the Union's circle and stars in the top half and the country's international vehicle registration code CY in the bottom half and using German FE-Schrift as the typeface after 2013, replacing the DIN 1451 typeface previously in use as mandatory.

Style and numbering

before 1930

 F for Famagusta
 K for Kyrenia
 LL for Limassol
 N for Nicosia
 P for Paphos
 L for Larnaca

1930 - 1948

1948 - 1950

1950 - 1956

1956 - 1973

1973 - 1990

1990 - 2003

2003 - 2013

2013 - today (starting from MAA letter combination introduced in June 2013, only the following letters are used: ABEHKMNPTXYZ.

Special plates

Car dealer 

1973 - 1990

1990 - today

Dealer plates show the letters ΔΟΚΙΜΗ, which means Test, on a white plate, followed by two sets of numerals, the first being the number of the dealer and the second is a serial number. The only officially-made plates in Cyprus. Formerly, they had the same format as the civilian vehicles, but used the code DL and the characters were written in red colour.

Rental cars 

1973 - 1990

1990 - 2013

2013 - today

Composed of three letters and three numerals, on a dark red plate. The initial Z prefix was omitted after 2013.

Taxi 

1973 - 1990

1990 - 2003

2003 - 2013

2013 - today

Composed of three letters and three numerals, on a yellow plate. The initial T prefix was omitted after 2013.

Trailers 

1973 - 2013

Composed of up to five numerals with the suffix CT, on yellow plates. Since 2013, some numbers have been reissued on white plates.

2013 - today

Composed of five numerals and the prefix P, on white plates. Some early numbers were printed on remaining yellow plates.

Commercial trucks 

1973 - 1990

1990 - 2003

2003 - 2013

2013 - today

Composed of three letters and three numerals, on yellow plates. White front plates were omitted after 2013.

Temporary / Visitors 

1973 - 2003

Up to four numerals followed by the letter V, followed by two numerals indicating the year of registration. After 2004, you cannot register a car as visitor, but visitor cars registered before 2004 can still get road tax.

Diplomatic plates 

1973 - 1990

1990 - 2004

2004 - 2017

2017 - today

Composed of a two-digit code for the country (e.g. 29 for Russia or 49 for the Netherlands, followed by two letters (CD, CC or AT) and a serial number with up to three digits. Low serial numbers are used for vehicles of the ambassador of each country. Previously these plates had the same format as civilian plates, on a green base and the prefixes CD, CC or AT.

Historical Vehicles 
2013 - today

White-on-Black euroband plates for vehicles older than 40 years.

Other special plates 

Public service trucks and buses display secondary plates similar to the Spanish SP plates.
• ΦΔΧ - Φορτηγό Δημοσίας Χρήσης (public service truck) for trucks.
• ΛΔΧ - Λεωφορείο Δημοσίας Χρήσης (public service bus) for buses.

UNFICYP plates have a blue background and display the prefixes UN or UNF followed by three numerals.

Sovereign Base Areas plates are prefixed SBAA followed by two digits, and have adopted the same new colour and typeface as the Republic of Cyprus.

Export plates, from 1973 until 1990, showed the letter E followed by four numerals.

The president's car does not have a number on its plate, it displays the coat of arms of Cyprus instead.

Cypriot National Guard plates are composed of an old version of the Greek flag followed by the letters ΕΦ and up to five digits.

Northern Cyprus

Style and numbering
Northern Cyprus civilian number plates still use the old format (1973–1990) of Cyprus number plates (AB 123). Until 2018 front plates were white, rear plates yellow, both bordered in red. Two sizes are available: 300×150 mm or 520×110 mm.   

From 2018 both front and rear number plates are white with embossed black letters and numbers, and a blue stripe on the left. The stripe must contain the stamp of the Motor Vehicles Registrar and the registration number of the number plate manufacturers. Number plates had to be changed before the end of January 2019.  

1973 - 2018

2018 - today

Special plates

Taxis

Taxi plates show the prefix T, followed by two letters and three digits, formerly one letter only.

Trailer

Trailer plates show three numerals and the letter R.

Rental vehicles
1973 - 2018

2018 - today

Rental car plates have black signs on a red base, they show a prefix Z, followed by two letters and three digits.

Government / Police
1973 - 2018

2018 - today

Government and council vehicle registrations show black signs on a white base, composed of the three letters RHA and up to four numerals.
Police and Fire Brigade number plates follow the same format, but with inversed colours, with white signs on a black base.

Army

number plates of vehicles of the Cypriot armed forces are composed of seven numerals, with white signs on a small black plate.

Diplomatic plates
1973 - 2018

2018 - today

Diplomatic plates have the same format as civilian plates, but on a green base and with a CD prefix. Consulates follow the same format but uses CC instead of CD.

Visitor
1973 - 2018

2018 - today

Visitor plates have red characters with the prefix ZZ and up to four numerals. Until 2018 they had blue characters.

Temporary
1973 - 2018

2018 - today

Temporary plates have red characters and border with the prefix ZT, and up to four numerals followed by one letter.

President
1973 - 2018

2018 - today

Previously, the presidential plate did not have a number, just the abbreviation of KKTCB. 
This was changed in 2015, with the coat of arms being displayed in gold on a red plate.

References

External links
 

Transport in Cyprus
Cyprus
Cyprus transport-related lists
 Registration plates